The South Australian Railways Y class was a class of narrow gauge steam locomotives operated by the South Australian Railways.

History
The Y class were numerically the largest class of steam locomotive operated by the South Australian Railways (SAR). With a Mogul (2-6-0) wheel arrangement widely used in Australia at the time, 129 were built between 1885 and 1898. Beyer, Peacock & Co, Manchester built 50, James Martin & Co of Gawler 77, and the SAR's Islington Railway Workshops 2. They operated across the SAR's narrow gauge network. Between 1904 and 1924, 48 were fitted with new Belpaire boilers and reclassified as the Yx class.

They were part of what became almost an Australian  standard, as locomotives of similar design served in large numbers as the Silverton Tramway Y class, Tasmanian Government Railways C class and Western Australian Government Railways G class, and also in Queensland and on the Emu Bay Railway and North Australia Railway.

Some were sold for further service to railway construction companies while others saw further service on the timber railway lines of Western Australia. During World War II, 18 were sold to the Commonwealth Railways for use on the North Australia Railway as the Nfb class. Seven of these were sold in 1948 to the Tasmanian Government Railways, but only four entered service (as F1–F4).

Preserved locomotives
, there were 10 preserved Y and Yx class locomotives (of which Yx141 was operational), as follows:

References

External links

Beyer, Peacock locomotives
Railway locomotives introduced in 1885
Y
2-6-0 locomotives
3 ft 6 in gauge locomotives of Australia